Mohamed Abdulghani is an Ethiopian economist and politician of the Somali ethnicity. He is the President of the Somali Region Chamber of Commerce based in Jijiga, Ethiopia.

References

Living people
Ethnic Somali people
Ethiopian economists
Ethiopian politicians
Year of birth missing (living people)